Jaïro Jocquim Riedewald (born 9 September 1996) is a Dutch professional footballer who plays as a defender or midfielder for  club Crystal Palace.

Club career

Ajax

2013–14
On 15 March 2013, Riedewald signed his first professional contract with Ajax, a product of the Ajax Youth Academy having joined the club from SV Overbos at the age of 11. His first contract with the club was a three-year contract binding him to the club until 2016. On 21 December 2013 he made his professional debut in the Eerste Divisie, the second tier of professional football in the Netherlands, playing for the reserves team Jong Ajax, in a match against VVV-Venlo which ended in a 5–1 away loss.

On 14 December 2013, Ajax head coach Frank de Boer announced the inclusion of Riedewald in the first team squad for the away match against SC Cambuur on 15 December 2013. Not having made an appearance in that fixture it was the first time he was called for the first team. He made his debut for the first team on 19 December 2013 in the KNVB Cup match against IJsselmeervogels. The match ended in a 3–0 away win, with Riedewald coming on for Daley Blind in the 73rd minute of the match. Three days later he made his Eredivisie debut against Roda JC Kerkrade. After Bojan Krkić, Riedewald was substituted on as well in the 80th minute, where he replaced Christian Poulsen, quickly scoring two goals, after trailing 1–0, helping Ajax to a 2–1 away victory, hereby becoming the youngest scoring debutant in the club and league history with 17 years, 104 days. The youngest scoring player before him in the Dutch Eredivisie was Jeroen Lumu with 17 years, 111 days, while Marco van Basten was the youngest scoring debutant at the club with 17 year, 154 days of age.

In January 2014, Riedewald became a permanent member of the first team at Ajax. On 27 February 2014, Riedewald made his continental debut for Ajax, in the UEFA Europa League away match against Red Bull Salzburg where he replaced Christian Poulsen in the 63rd minute in an eventual 3-1 loss.

2014–15

2015–16

After Niklas Moisander departed the club at the start of the 2015–16 season, Ajax manager Frank de Boer decided to choose Riedewald as the new partner of Joël Veltman in central defense. In de Klassieker against Feyenoord on 7 February 2016, Riedewald got injured soon after kick-off; he had broken his left ankle, which ended his season early. Until that moment, he had only missed one league game due to suspension. However, he returned early from injury on 1 May 2016, replacing Kenny Tete in the 76th minute in a match against FC Twente.

2016–17
After Ajax lost the Eredivisie title to PSV on the last matchday of the season by drawing to De Graafschap, manager De Boer decided to leave the club. His successor Peter Bosz decided to use Riedewald more as a defensive midfielder during the opening of the season. On 15 September 2016, Riedewald scored the rebound of Davy Klaassen's missed penalty in a Europa League match against Panathinaikos, his first goal for Ajax since his debut match.

Crystal Palace
In July 2017, Riedewald signed a five-year contract with Premier League side Crystal Palace for an undisclosed fee, believed to be in the region of £8m.

He was named the club's player of the month in January 2020 and again in October 2020. He scored his first goal for Palace in a 2-1 away win over Fulham on 24 October 2020.

In February 2021, Riedewald extended his contract with Crystal Palace until 2024.

International career
Riedewald received his first call up to the senior Netherlands team in August 2015. On 6 September, he made his official debut for Oranje against Turkey.

Personal life
Born in Haarlem, Riedewald is of mixed Dutch, Surinamese and Indonesian heritage. His father hails from Suriname, while his mother is of half Dutch, half Indonesian descent.

Career statistics

Honours
Ajax
Eredivisie: 2013–14
UEFA Europa League runner-up: 2016–17

References

External links

Profile at the Crystal Palace F.C. website

1996 births
Living people
Footballers from Amsterdam
Dutch footballers
Netherlands youth international footballers
Netherlands under-21 international footballers
Netherlands international footballers
Association football defenders
AFC Ajax players
Jong Ajax players
Crystal Palace F.C. players
Eerste Divisie players
Eredivisie players
Premier League players
Dutch expatriate footballers
Expatriate footballers in England
Dutch expatriate sportspeople in England
Dutch people of Indonesian descent
Dutch sportspeople of Surinamese descent